Princess Christian Maternity Hospital is a hospital in Freetown, Sierra Leone nicknamed the 'Cottage Hospital'. In May 2006 Ahmad Tejan Kabbah re-opened the hospital alongside Connaught Hospital.

2014 Ebola epidemic
Princess Christian Maternity hospital came under severe pressure during the 2014 Ebola virus epidemic in Sierra Leone. Scientific studies have shown that pregnant women are among the least likely to survive an onset of ebola, most likely because the mother's body lowers its immune response to prevent it rejecting the baby. In a previous outbreak in Zaire, 14 out of 15 pregnant women who contracted the disease died. With the country's health facilities completely overrun and already unable to cope with the patient numbers, the authorities decided to place pregnant women last in the queue for treatment, and also segregated them from other ebola patients, under the assumption that there was little that could be done to save them. Most of the pregnant ebola patients were sent to Princess Christian, but with health resources committed elsewhere, the hospital was severely neglected and conditions were so bad that the United Nations proposed closing the hospital altogether.

References

Buildings and structures in Freetown
Hospitals in Sierra Leone
Hospitals with year of establishment missing
Maternity hospitals
Maternity in Sierra Leone